Life's Twist is a 1920 American silent drama film directed by Christy Cabanne with Bessie Barriscale in a dual role. With a survival status classified as unknown, so it may be a lost film.

Plot
As described in a film magazine, following her marriage to Steven De Koven (McGrail), Muriel Chester (Barriscale) discovers his indifference towards her and the fact that she was bargained to him for social position by her ambitious parents. Unaware that he had refused a proffered financial settlement at the same time, she repulses his attempts to be agreeable and lives in independence of his companionship. He seeks to console himself with Tina Pierce (Barriscale), a young woman of the slums, and establishes her in luxury to find that he cannot, after all, be interested only in the wife for whom he realizes a belated affection. Despaired of untangling their problematic existence, he decides to go abroad, only to be deterred by the forgiving and understanding wife, whom Tina had made clear the situation between them.

Cast
Bessie Barriscale as Muriel Chester / Tina Pierce
Walter McGrail as Steven De Koven
King Baggot as Jim Sargent
Claire Du Brey as Mrs. Helen Sutton
George Periolat as Mr. Boyd Chester
Truly Shattuck as Mrs. Chester
William V. Mong as Charlie Moye
Marcia Manon as The Dope Fiend

Production
Twenty-three sets were built for the film at a reported cost of $25,000 (not including set dressing rooms).

References

External links

1920 films
American silent feature films
1920 drama films
Silent American drama films
American black-and-white films
Film Booking Offices of America films
1920s American films